is a 2013 Japanese horror found footage  film written and directed by Kōji Shiraishi about several actresses who play themselves as they appear on a paranormal television show to investigate the supernatural malevolent forces that haunting the Kaneda family. It was released in Japan on July 20, 2013.

Plot

Tomoe Kaneda and her 15-year-old daughter Miho have been experiencing strange bumps, bangs, rumbles, and shocks since they moved into their house three months ago. When Miho records a short movie to capture one of these sudden thumps, she unknowingly captures a ghostly face in the background. This in turn catches the attention of an investigatory television program, which sends several popular actresses to document the subsequent exorcism.

The actresses Yu Abiru, Mayuko Iwasa, and Mari Iriki are nervous and suspicious, they decide to go to the Kaneda's home to meet the mother, daughter, and the Buddhist priest Unsui. The priest explains that the energy around the house is impure, and performs several purification gestures, chants, and rituals. However, several strange incidents occur. After one such ritual, where he places a small dish of salt on the floor to help cleanse the area, the dish flies up into the air of its own accord and seemingly vanishes, leaving behind only the salt on the floor in a strange, spiral-like geometric pattern. Miho then displays a large piece of the shattered plate, which she says suddenly appeared in her hand. In another demonstration, a tennis ball rolls along it of its own accord. Unsui explains that this is the route of evil energy near the home. He instructs everyone not to eat any meat until after the house is fully exorcised, lest they attract negative spirits.

Later, during the exorcism, it is revealed that one of the actresses sneakily ate a hamburger. The exorcism seems to fail, and the family dog is lured upstairs to Miho's bedroom, where Miho herself enters, in a feral trance, and eats the pet. Unsui is barely able to subdue her. The trio of actresses returned to the house, this time with Unsui and his superior, the more powerful Ryugen. They first show another dish of salt, which burns Miho's hands when she touches it. The priests explain that this is because an evil spirit is still attached to Miho. The actresses, however, all find the salt to be room-temperature, except Mari, who jokes that it is hot, only to be chided by the others for joking about something that is becoming more and more serious. Mari apologizes and becomes silent with guilt. She breaks down in tears and returns home before the exorcism can occur.

At the next exorcism, an apparition appears, a black tendril of smoke with a gaping face for a head. The two monks chant fiercely, however, the black spirit manages to touch Unsui, causing him to collapse. Ryugen is barely able to banish it. Afterward, Miho and her mother send a thank-you video to the actress's television company, however, the surface of the smooth kitchen table catches Miho's reflection, which is her face contorted with a gaping mouth.

The actresses then receive news that Unsui did not recover and passed away two days after the exorcism, and Ryugen was in a serious accident and is now in the hospital. Yu and Mayuko visit Ryugen in the hospital, where he is weakly able to warn them that the house is yet impure. As the actresses leave, Ryugen stops responding, becoming fixated on an empty corner of the hospital room. Security footage later shows a tall, thin black tendril of smoke appearing in the corner of the room. In a panic and too wounded to escape, Ryugen chants mantra to no avail. It approaches him, fills his lungs, and causes a seizure which ultimately kills the priest.

Meanwhile, a new exorcist has joined the actresses, the eccentric and arrogant Neo, who self-styled after the main character from the Matrix. He is disappointed that Mari is still absent, as the only reason he is offering his assistance is that he wants to meet her after seeing her on television. His rude demeanor initially makes the staff dismiss him as a crank, however, he can perform impromptu psychic surgery on one of the actresses and removes a remnant of an evil spirit, a twisted black coil of flesh, convincing them to join him.

Together, they return to the house. Neo comments on the tainted atmosphere, and he finds several totems which have been secreted around the house, confirming that someone has purposefully cursed it. They discover that the neighbors have been casting the curse, and confront them. One of the neighbors is a sickly-looking woman with a mark on her skin that looks exactly like the salt pattern from earlier. Neo is finally able to exorcise the mother and daughter fully. The neighbors move away the very next day. Meanwhile, the security footage shows Mari being scolded by her boss for running away from her job, however, she smiles and uses her telekinetic ability to crush him with his desk, all while explaining that her god is coming.

Later that night, while the Kanedas are sleeping, a strange group of people walk up to the house and begin chanting. This seems to curse the house once again. Tomoe wakes up and walks to her daughter's room, vomiting an evil spirit into her before leaving to join the chanters outside. However, they are approached by Neo, who frightens them away with a cursed totem from earlier. He subdues the mother and daughter and calls the television crew to come back.

The two actresses are horrified at first that he has tied up seemingly innocent people, however, he produces a photograph of Miho and her mother from before they moved into the house, and it is evident that Tomoe is a different person from the woman in the photograph. Tomoe is revealed to also have a geometric pattern on her skin, hidden by her clothing. She admits that she is part of a cult that kidnapped Miho and managed to alter her memories using mild possession with evil spirits, as those who are possessed are highly susceptible to suggestion. Miho, she explains, happens to be the perfect conduit for their god to enter the human world, which will result in the end of everything, fulfilling their god's prophecy.

Neo tries to banish the spirit which possesses Miho, however, it materializes fully into its true form, a strange twisted mass of tentacles, topped with a human-like head that opens its mouth to reveal more long tentacles. It battles with Neo and he manages to subdue it, however, his power is spent and overwhelmed. In the chaos, Tomoe attempts to flee, and an apparition of Mari appears, explaining that the wheels are now in motion. God is interested in this world, so it is inevitable it will find another doorway and fully emerge, and the world and life as we know it will come to the end.

Cast
 Yu Abiru as herself
 Mayuko Iwasa as herself
 Mari Iriki as herself
 Natsumi Okamoto as herself
 Mari Hayashida as Yoko Taniguchi, program director
 Hajime Inoue as Ryugen
 Shigehiro Yamaguchi as Unsui
 Sayuri Oyamada as Tomoe Kaneda
 Ryosuke Miura as NEO

Production
The film was released in Japan on July 20, 2013. The UK premiere took place on October 31, 2013.

References

External links

 (in Japanese)

2013 films
2013 horror films
Japanese horror films
Japanese supernatural horror films
Films directed by Kōji Shiraishi
Japanese haunted house films
Found footage films
2010s Japanese films
2010s Japanese-language films